Dirk Greiser (born 24 February 1963 in West Berlin) is a retired German footballer.

References

External links 
 

1963 births
Living people
German footballers
Association football defenders
Bundesliga players
2. Bundesliga players
Tennis Borussia Berlin players
Hertha BSC players
SG Wattenscheid 09 players
Wacker 04 Berlin players
Footballers from Berlin